Stenocercus erythrogaster is a species of lizard of the Tropiduridae family. It is found in Colombia and Venezuela.

References

Stenocercus
Reptiles described in 1856
Reptiles of Colombia
Reptiles of Venezuela
Taxa named by Edward Hallowell (herpetologist)